4th Tank Regiment may refer to:
4th Royal Tank Regiment, a British unit extant 1917 – 1992
4th Tank Regiment (Japan), extant 1934 – 1945